The Plummer Memorial Library is a historic library at 375 Auburn Street in Newton, Massachusetts.  Once operated as a branch of the Newton Free Library, the city's public library system, it was closed in 2009 due to financial cuts.  It is now operated as a community library by a local non-profit organization.

The building is a -story Tudor style brick building, built in 1927 with funding by subscription from Newton residents.  The building was listed on the National Register of Historic Places in 1990.

See also
 Newton Centre Branch Library
 Waban Branch Library
 National Register of Historic Places listings in Newton, Massachusetts

References

External links
Library web site

Library buildings completed in 1927
National Register of Historic Places in Newton, Massachusetts
Libraries on the National Register of Historic Places in Massachusetts
Libraries in Newton, Massachusetts
Libraries in Middlesex County, Massachusetts